The Maison de la Chimie ("the House of Chemistry") is an international conference center in Paris, France, located near the National Assembly.

The house is managed by a nonprofit association, La Fondation de la Maison de la Chimie. Its primary objective is to assist and help scientists and engineers working in the field of chemistry, through the organization of meetings, colloquia and conferences.

The house provides office space to various associations involved in scientific and technological fields. The headquarters of the Société Astronomique de France was located in the house from 1966 to 1974.

Halls and rooms are also rented for meetings whose topics lie outside the field of chemistry; these other usages actually represent 75% to 80% of the activity. Because of its central location in Paris, near the National Assembly and several ministries, the house is particularly sought for meetings with elected officials.

Access

See also
 Maison de la Mutualité

References

External links
 Official site of the foundation
 Official site of the conference center

Buildings and structures in Paris
Science and technology in France